"Dirty Blvd." is a Lou Reed song from his 1989 album, New York. The song contrasts the poor and the rich in New York City, and topped the Billboard Modern Rock Tracks chart for four weeks in early 1989. Live versions appear on Perfect Night: Live in London and Animal Serenade. "Dirty Blvd." was one of the four songs Reed performed with David Bowie on the latter's 50th birthday celebration in 1997. "Dirty Blvd." is a rock song with a slight country influence, featuring a three-chord progression with a repeated sequence of G D A D.

Charts

See also
List of Billboard Modern Rock Tracks number ones of the 1980s

References

External links

Lou Reed songs
1988 singles
1988 songs
Songs written by Lou Reed
Songs about New York City
Songs about streets
Sire Records singles